Mighty Oak is a 2020 American comedy-drama musical film directed by Sean McNamara.

Plot 
A young guitarist, reminiscent of a late vocalist, joins a musical band which leads to theories of reincarnation.

Cast 
Janel Parrish as Gina Jackson
Alexa PenaVega as Valerie Scoggins
Carlos PenaVega as Pedro
Raven-Symoné as Taylor Lazlo
Levi Dylan as Vaughn Jackson
Tommy Ragen as Oak Scoggins
Ben Milliken as Darby
Rodney Hicks as Dwayne Biggs

Production 
Most of the film was shot in Ocean Beach and other parts of San Diego.

Reception 
On review aggregator website Rotten Tomatoes, the film holds an approval rating of 60% based on 20 reviews and an average rating of 6/10.

Philip Martin of Arkansas Democrat-Gazette gave it an 80 out of 100, stating "It's sunny and wistful; something to go see if that's what you need right now."

Nick Allen at RogerEbert.com scored it a 1.5 out of 4 and said "This premise would excel far better, and go much deeper with its targeted themes, in something like a dark comedy; that Mighty Oak embraces this delusion with no sarcasm and a lot of wish fulfillment is at the very least worrisome."

See also 

 List of media set in San Diego

References

External links 
 
 

2020 films
American independent films
Films set in San Diego
Films shot in San Diego
2020 independent films
2020 comedy-drama films
Films directed by Sean McNamara
Films about music and musicians
Films about reincarnation
Paramount Pictures films
2020s English-language films
2020s American films